Herval is a Brazilian municipality in the southern part of the state of Rio Grande do Sul. The population is 6,814 (2020 est.) in an area of 1757.84 km². Its elevation is 287 m. Its main industry is agriculture.

Herval is situated south of the Piratini River, which was defined in 1777 as the border between the Spanish and Portuguese possessions. The current border between Uruguay and Brazil lies further south, at the Jaguarão River.

Herval is famous for its international rodeo festival, organized every January.

Bounding municipalities
Arroio Grande
Jaguarão
Pedras Altas
Pedro Osório
Pinheiro Machado
Piratini

References

External links
http://www.citybrazil.com.br/rs/herval/ 

Municipalities in Rio Grande do Sul